Auguste-Édouard Gilliaert (7 March 1894 – 10 May 1973) was a Belgian colonial soldier who served in both world wars, and a commander of the Force Publique in the Belgian Congo.

Career

Early life and World War I
After joining the Belgian Army in 1910, Gilliaert received an officer's commission in July 1914. With the outbreak of World War I, he fought in battles along the Yser River, near Ostende. In 1916, he volunteered for service in Central Africa, in what was then the Belgian Congo, and took part as a captain in the East Africa Campaign fighting in German East Africa. Gilliaert returned to Belgium in 1919, commanding units at home and in occupied Germany.

World War II
By World War II, Major-General Gilliaert was the commander of the "Belgian Expeditionary Forces" in East Africa during the East African Campaign of World War II.  The Belgian Expeditionary Force was a Free Belgian colonial unit composed of troops from the Belgian Congo. In July 1941, Gilliaert cut off the retreat of Italian General Pietro Gazzera in Ethiopia and accepted the surrender of Gazzera's 7,000 troops.

After the successful conclusion of the campaign in East Africa, a part of the Force Publique was re-designated the 1st Belgian Congo Brigade Group and served in a garrison and rear-area security role in Cairo, Egypt and in British Palestine from 1943 to 1944. Gilliaert commanded the road march of the 2,000 man brigade on a journey of some 7,000 kilometers from Lagos to Cairo without losing a single man. Gilliaert was made commander of the Force Publique in July 1944 and promoted to Lieutenant-General in October 1951.

General Gilliaert returned to Belgium in March 1954 and retired on 1 April 1955.

Command history
 General Officer Commanding, Belgian Expeditionary Forces East Africa – 1941
 Commander of the Force Publique – 1944

Awards
 Commander of the Order of the African Star with Palm
 Honorary Commander of the Order of the British Empire

References

External links 
www.deplate.be
Biography of Auguste-Édouard Gilliaert (in French)
 Archive Auguste Gilliaert, Royal museum for central Africa

1894 births
Belgian military personnel of World War I
Belgian Army generals of World War II
Officers of the Force Publique
Belgian Army personnel of World War I
1973 deaths
Belgian Congo in World War II
Military personnel from Bruges